The House of Three Girls (German:Das Dreimäderlhaus) is a 1918 German silent film directed by Richard Oswald and starring Julius Spielmann, Wilhelm Diegelmann and Sybille Binder. It is based on the operetta Das Dreimäderlhaus. It is a lost film.

Cast
 Julius Spielmann as Franz Schubert
 Wilhelm Diegelmann as Tscholl  
 Sybille Binder as Hannerl  
 Kathe Oswald as Heiderl  
 Ruth Werner as Hederl  
 Anita Berber as Grisi 
 Conrad Veidt as Baron Schober
 Bruno Eichgrün as Vogl
 Eynor Ingesson as Moritz von Schwind
 Raoul Lange as Niccolò Paganini
 Adolf Suchanek as Graf Schamrotff 
 Max Gülstorff as Nowotnz, ein Vertrauter

See also
 Blossom Time (1934)
 Three Girls for Schubert (1936)
 The House of Three Girls (1958)

References

Bibliography
 John T. Soister. Conrad Veidt on Screen: A Comprehensive Illustrated Filmography. McFarland, 2002.

External links

1918 films
1910s historical films
German historical films
Films of the German Empire
Films directed by Richard Oswald
German silent feature films
Films set in the 1820s
Films set in Vienna
Biographical films about musicians
Films about composers
Films about classical music and musicians
Films based on Austrian novels
Films based on adaptations
Films based on operettas
German black-and-white films
Cultural depictions of Franz Schubert
Cultural depictions of Niccolò Paganini
1910s German films